Nemophila pedunculata is a common annual wildflower found throughout western North America. Its common names include littlefoot nemophila and meadow nemophila.

Nemophila pedunculata grows low to the ground, with a fleshy stem and thick, bristly leaves. The flowers are tiny, only about a centimeter wide. They are a broad bell shape and they vary widely in color. Some are blue, but most are white with a variety of markings, including small blue streaks or speckles, or an eye-catching purple spot at the tip of each petal. Its native habitats include ocean bluffs, moist open places, and grasslands.

References

External links
Jepson Manual Treatment — Nemophila pedunculata
Calflora Database: Nemophila pedunculata (littlefoot nemophila,  meadow nemophila)
Nemophila pedunculata — UC Photo gallery

pedunculata
Flora of the West Coast of the United States
Flora of California
Flora of Idaho
Flora of Nevada
Flora of the California desert regions
Flora of the Cascade Range
Flora of the Great Basin
Flora of the Klamath Mountains
Flora of the Sierra Nevada (United States)
Natural history of the California chaparral and woodlands
Natural history of the California Coast Ranges
Natural history of the Peninsular Ranges
Natural history of the San Francisco Bay Area
Natural history of the Santa Monica Mountains
Natural history of the Transverse Ranges
Flora without expected TNC conservation status